Jonathan Daniel Carman (born January 14, 1976) was an American football offensive lineman for the Buffalo Bills of the National Football League 2000–2001. He played college football for Nassau Community College and Georgia Tech.

References

Living people
1976 births
Sportspeople from Fairfax County, Virginia
American football offensive tackles
Georgia Tech Yellow Jackets football players
Buffalo Bills players
Nassau Lions football players
Nassau Community College alumni
People from Herndon, Virginia